Helicteroideae is a subfamily of the family Malvaceae. Some taxonomists place genera in Helicteroideae in distinct families Durionaceae and Helicteraceae, while others recognizes the tribes Durioneae and Helictereae.

References

 
Rosid subfamilies